The Miss Perú 2001 pageant was held on the night of April 27, 2001 at the Swissotel in San Isidro, Lima, Peru following weeks of competition. Twenty candidates from all over the country competed for two national titles. That year, Jessica Newton, returned as the main head of the organization after regaining the Miss Universe franchise after six years having already had the Miss World one. Given the short amount of time after taking over the new franchise, Newton's goal was to select a prepared candidate fast enough to compete in the following month's Miss Universe 2001 pageant in Bayamón, Puerto Rico.  The remaining contestants competed for the right to represent the country in Sun City, South Africa at the end of the year.

The outgoing titleholder, Verónica Ruecker of Piura crowned her successor, Viviana Rivasplata of Lambayeque as Miss Peru 2001 midway through the contest in a "Gala de la Belleza" show. Meanwhile, Tatiana Angulo of La Libertad crowned her successor, Marina Mora, also from La Libertad, as the new Miss World Peru 2001 at the end of the event.

Mora, originally chosen to compete at Miss World 2001, faced a string of personal problems during her year of reign. Due to a restructure backed up by the organization, it was decided that Rivasplata would also represent Peru at Miss World following her representation at Miss Universe, and that Mora would go on to compete at Miss World 2002.

Placements

The Miss Peru Universe selection was held separately from the main competition, chosen midway through the contest in "Gala de la Belleza" with the purpose being to select the Peruvian representative for Miss Universe 2001.

The rest of contestants remained for the right to compete in Miss World 2001.

Special Awards

 Best Regional Costume - Lambayeque - Viviana Rivasplata
 Miss Photogenic - La Libertad - Marina Mora
 Miss Elegance - Tumbes - Paola Castrillón
 Miss Body - Lambayeque - Viviana Rivasplata
 Best Hair - San Martín - Ivette Santa María
 Miss Congeniality - Puno - Adriana Quevedo
 Most Beautiful Face - Puno - Adriana Quevedo

Delegates

References 

Miss Peru
2001 in Peru
2001 beauty pageants